Splash is a retrospective album by the American folk band Sonia & Disappear Fear, released on January 16, 2009 by Sonia's own Disappear Records label and Rounder/Philo Records. The album is composed of songs from Sonia's solo career as well as the earlier incarnation of her band, simply known as Disappear Fear.

Track listing
All songs performed by Sonia & Disappear Fear, unless otherwise noted.

Track info
Track 4 is based on a verse by Harlem Renaissance poet Countee Cullen.
Tracks 10 & 11 are previously unreleased songs.
Track 11 is based on the poem by Pastor Martin Niemöller written during the Holocaust.

Personnel
Sonia & Disappear Fear
Sonia Rutstein (SONiA) - lead vocals, guitar, piano, harmonica
Cindy Frank (CiNDY) - vocals
Howard Markman - guitar
Laura Cerulli - percussionist, backing vocals
John Grant - electric guitar, acoustic guitar, bass, programming
Christopher Sellman - bass

References

Disappear Fear albums
2009 compilation albums